Alyssa Ann Lagonia (born 30 June 1989) is a Canadian former professional soccer player who was a midfielder for Swiss Women's Super League club Servette Chênois and the Canada national team. She previously played for Apollon Ladies in Cyprus, Bardolino Verona in Italy, Doncaster Rovers Belles in England and in the W-League for Toronto Lady Lynx and Ottawa Fury.

Club career

Early career 
From 2008 to 2011, Lagonia played in the W-League for both the Toronto Lady Lynx and the Ottawa Fury. In March 2012, Lagonia signed a professional contract with Doncaster Rovers Belles. In January 2013, she signed for Italian club Bardolino Verona. She would go on to a play for Swiss club Neunkirch and Apollon Ladies F.C. in the Cypriot First Division.

Servette Chênois 
In 2019, she signed a contract to join Swiss club Servette Chênois. She announced her playing retirement in July 2022, but she continued to be employed at UEFA headquarters in Nyon.

International career
Lagonia made her senior international debut for Canada in March 2009, playing against New Zealand at the Cyprus Cup.

Honours

Club 
Servette Chênois

 Swiss Women's Super League: 2020-21

See also

 Foreign players in the FA WSL

References

External links

 
Lagonia at Doncaster Rovers Belles LFC
 
Lagonia at Servette Football Club Chênois féminin in Geneva (Switzerland)

1989 births
FC Neunkirch players
A.S.D. AGSM Verona F.C. players
Women's association football midfielders
Canada women's international soccer players
Canadian expatriate women's soccer players
Canadian people of Italian descent
Canadian women's soccer players
Doncaster Rovers Belles L.F.C. players
Women's Super League players
Living people
Serie A (women's football) players
Soccer people from Ontario
Sportspeople from Kitchener, Ontario
USL W-League (1995–2015) players
Wilfrid Laurier Golden Hawks soccer players
Expatriate women's footballers in England
Expatriate women's footballers in Switzerland
Expatriate women's footballers in Italy
Canadian expatriate sportspeople in Italy
Canadian expatriate sportspeople in Switzerland
Canadian expatriate sportspeople in England
Apollon Ladies F.C. players
Servette FC Chênois Féminin players
Swiss Women's Super League players
Toronto Lady Lynx players
Ottawa Fury (women) players
Expatriate women's footballers in Cyprus
Canadian expatriate sportspeople in Cyprus